The Asian Team Championships are the international squash competition played between teams representing different nations organised by the Asian Squash Federation. Countries enter teams of three or four players to represent them in the championships. In each round of the competition, teams face each other in a best-of-three singles matches contest. Each competition is held once every two years since 1984, except for 2020 edition which was postponed to 2021 due to COVID-19 pandemic.

Past results

Men's championship

Women's championship

Statistics

Titles by country

Men

Women

Medals summary

Men

Women

See also 
 Asian Squash Federation
 Asian Individual Squash Championships
 World Team Squash Championships

References

External links 
 Asian Squash Federation website
 Asian Team Championships Squashsite 2012

Squash_Team_Championships
Squash in Asia
Squash tournaments
Squash records and statistics
Recurring sporting events established in 1981
de:Squash-Asienmeisterschaft